Quercus lowii is a species of oak (Quercus) native to the mountains of northern Borneo.

Range and habitat
Quercus lowii is native to Malaysian Borneo. It is mostly found in the vicinity of Mount Kinabalu in Sabah state, along with a single location in Sarawak.

Quercus lowii grows in montane rain forest between 1,500 and 2,500 metres elevation. It is typically found on soils derived from ultrabasic rocks.

Conservation
Quercus lowii is affected by habitat loss from deforestation and replacement of its native forests with tree plantations. Its conservation status is assessed as near threatened.

Taxonomy
Quercus lowii is classed in subgenus Cerris, section Cyclobalanopsis. Its specific name, lowii, was given in honour of Hugh Low (1824-1905), the British naturalist who collected the initial specimen.

Historically, it has also been referred to as Cyclobalanopsis lowii.

References

External links
 
 
 
 
 
 

lowii
Endemic flora of Borneo
Flora of Sabah
Flora of Sarawak
Flora of the Borneo montane rain forests
Plants described in 1889